Al-Faqaʿ is a village on the border of the Emirate of Dubai and the Eastern Region of the Emirate of Abu Dhabi, the United Arab Emirates (UAE), located on the Dubai-Al Ain highway (E 66 or Tahnoun Bin Mohammad Al Nahyan Road), the village straddles the border between the two emirates. It has a Dubai police station, and a population of some 370 residents in 2015.

See also 
 Swaihan

References 

Populated places in the United Arab Emirates
Eastern Region, Abu Dhabi
Emirate of Dubai